The K-15 Krajina was a tactical ballistic missile displayed in Republic of Serbian Krajina in June 1995. It appeared to be a modified Soviet Navy P-15 Termit Anti-ship missile which was converted for use as a ballistic missile mounted on a S-75 Dvina launcher.

The range was estimated to be 150 km (93 mi).
The extremely limited range of the K-15 Krajina, combined with what is presumed to be a small payload, made the threat from such a weapon minimal. Sources suggest that the missile development was continued by Serbia and Montenegro well into 1996.

References 

Military of Serbian Krajina
Tactical ballistic missiles